Cho Ki-Jung (June 22, 1939 – December 20, 2007) was a South Korean potter who was designated as living treasure by the Gwangju Metropolitan Government in 1986 for his achievement to revive Goryeo celadon.

Style and nature of his work
He works in traditional styles.  He rediscovered how to produce blue celadons of the quality of Goryeo times.

See also
List of Korean ceramic artists and sculptors
List of people of Korean descent

Notes

External links
http://www.antiquealive.com/masters/m16/master16_view3.html (tells of his search to recreate blue celadon)

South Korean ceramists
South Korean potters
1939 births
2007 deaths
20th-century ceramists